Platte Township, Nebraska may refer to the following places:

 Platte Township, Buffalo County, Nebraska
 Platte Township, Butler County, Nebraska
 Platte Township, Dodge County, Nebraska

Also in Nebraska:
 South Platte Township, Hall County, Nebraska

See also

Platte Township (disambiguation)

Nebraska township disambiguation pages